Tommy Rovelstad (born 8 November 1972) is a Norwegian sledge hockey player.

He began to play competitively in 1996. He has won a gold medal (1998), two silver medals (2002, 2006) and a bronze medal (2010) at the Winter Paralympics.

Titles
2010 Winter Paralympics
Bronze
2008 World Championships
Silver
2006 Winter Paralympics
Silver
2004 World Championships
Gold
2002 Winter Paralympics
Silver
2000 World Championships
Silver
1998 Winter Paralympics
Gold

References

External links 
 

1972 births
Living people
Norwegian sledge hockey players
Paralympic sledge hockey players of Norway
Ice sledge hockey players at the 1998 Winter Paralympics
Ice sledge hockey players at the 2002 Winter Paralympics
Ice sledge hockey players at the 2006 Winter Paralympics
Ice sledge hockey players at the 2010 Winter Paralympics
Paralympic gold medalists for Norway
Paralympic silver medalists for Norway
Paralympic bronze medalists for Norway
Medalists at the 1998 Winter Paralympics
Medalists at the 2002 Winter Paralympics
Medalists at the 2006 Winter Paralympics
Medalists at the 2010 Winter Paralympics
Paralympic medalists in sledge hockey
Ice hockey people from Oslo